Návrat (Czech feminine: Návratová), sometimes spelled Nawrat or Nawrath, is a surname derived from the Czech noun návrat. Notable people with this surname include:

 Matthias Nawrat (born 1979), German writer
 Philipp Nawrath (born 1993), German biathlete
 Zdeněk Návrat (born 1931), Czech ice hockey player

See also
 Nawrot, a Polish-language cognate

Czech-language surnames